The Herald of Freedom (1788–1791) or Herald of Freedom and the Federal Advertiser was a newspaper published in Boston, Massachusetts, in the late 18th century by Edmund Freeman, Loring Andrews, and John Howel.

In 1790–1791 the paper "was engaged in the first libel-suit tried in Massachusetts after the Revolution, ... for a savage attack on a member of the Legislature," John Gardiner.  The Heralds printer, Edmund Freeman, was "charged ... with publishing in his paper ... a most ... scandalous and malicious libel." "The libel complained of, charged Mr. Gardiner, with the atrocious murder of his late excellent lady [Margaret Harries], by cruelty." On February 3, 1790, "at 12, o'clock, at noon" Freeman "was taken into custody, by virtue of a warrant from Mr. Justice Crafts." "The case was decided in favor of the newspaper. Harrison Gray Otis, one of the most brilliant men of his day, was counsel for the editor."

References

Further reading

 From the Centinel. Proceedings on the Examination of the Printer of the Herald. Herald of Freedom, Date: 02-12-1790
 Massachusetts. Boston, February 1. Vermont Journal, and the Universal Advertiser; Date: 02-17-1790.
 [Account of the trial]. Herald of Freedom; Date: 03-04-1791.
 Supreme Judicial Court; trial for a libel: Commonwealth vs. Freeman. Herald of Freedom; Date: 03-11-1791
 Trial for a Libel. Middlesex Gazette (Connecticut); Date: 03-26-1791
 Joseph Tinker Buckingham. Specimens of newspaper literature: with personal memoirs, anecdotes, and reminiscences, Volume 1. Redding and Co., 1852. Google books

1788 establishments in Massachusetts
18th century in Boston
1780s in the United States
1790s in the United States
Newspapers published in Boston
Defunct newspapers published in Massachusetts
Publications established in 1788
Publications disestablished in 1791